Alonzo Dillard Folger (July 9, 1888 – April 30, 1941) was a Democratic U.S Congressman from North Carolina between 1939 and 1941.

Born in Dobson, North Carolina, Folger attended public schools in Surry County and attended the University of North Carolina at Chapel Hill. Folger graduated from UNC with a bachelor's degree in 1912 and a law degree in 1914.

He was admitted to the bar and opened a law practice in Dobson in 1914, relocating to Mount Airy to practice law there. From 1932 to 1938, he was a trustee of the University of North Carolina, and was named to the state's Superior Court in 1937.

Folger had served only two months as a judge when he resigned to serve on the Democratic National Committee; he was a member of the Committee from 1936 until his death in 1941. As a Democrat, he was elected to the 76th United States Congress in 1938 and re-election to the 77th U.S. Congress in 1940, but his second term was cut short by his death in a car accident in Mount Airy on April 30, 1941. In a special election, his brother John Hamlin Folger was chosen to succeed him on Congress. Alonzo Folger is buried in Dobson Cemetery in his hometown of Dobson.

See also
 List of United States Congress members who died in office (1900–49)

External links

1888 births
1941 deaths
People from Dobson, North Carolina
University of North Carolina School of Law alumni
Road incident deaths in North Carolina
Democratic Party members of the United States House of Representatives from North Carolina
20th-century American politicians